Klaus Fredenhagen (born 1 December 1947) is a German theoretical physicist who works on the mathematical foundations of quantum field theory.

Biography 
Klaus Fredenhagen was born on 1 December 1947 in Celle, a German city in Lower Saxony. He graduated in 1976 from the University of Hamburg under the supervision of Gert Roepstorff and Rudolf Haag. In 1985 he became a privatdozent and in 1990 a full professor at the second theory institute of the Hamburg University. Since 2013 he has been a professor emeritus and has continued to be active in research.

Scientific career 
His research interests are algebraic quantum field theory and quantum field theory in curved spacetime. In 1981 he proved the existence of antiparticles in massive quantum field theories without using the CPT-invariance. In 1990 he and Rudolf Haag made important contributions to the understanding of the Hawking radiation of black holes on a rigorous mathematical footing. In 1994, together with Sergio Doplicher and John E. Roberts, he investigated the mathematical foundations of quantum gravity in terms
of the quantum structure of spacetime at the Planck scale. In 1996, together with Romeo Brunetti, he started working on the generalization of the Epstein-Glaser renormalization procedure of interacting quantum field theories in curved spacetime using techniques from the microlocal analysis. He is currently working, together with Detlev Buchholz, on a new C*-algebraic approach to interacting quantum field theories.

Honors and awards 
In 1987 Klaus Fredenhagen was awarded the physics prize of the Göttingen Academy of Sciences and in 1997 he was Leibniz Professor at the University of Leipzig. In December 2017 the workshop Quantum Physics meets Mathematics was held in honor of his 70th birthday at the University of Hamburg.

Selected publications

Edited books

Articles

See also 

 Local quantum physics
 Microlocal analysis
 Principle of locality
 Quantum field theory
 Quantum field theory in curved spacetime
 Quantum gravity

References

External links 
 .
 
 .
 .
 
 

Living people
20th-century German physicists
21st-century German physicists
Academic staff of the University of Hamburg
1947 births
People from Celle
University of Hamburg alumni